Who's Quentin? is a 2005 Luxembourgish film written and directed by Sacha Bachim.

Selected cast 
Steve Hoegener as Kevin 
Patrick Brücher as Knaschti
Carole Biren as Zoé
Claude Kremer as Samson
Alexandra Linster as Lady in Black
Maik Müller-Wulff as The Voice
Marc Weidert as Petrus /Kleeschen
Tammy Schmitz as Schutzengel /Felix

External links
 
Official website 

Who's Quentin? at the Online Film Datenbank

Luxembourgian crime films
Luxembourgish-language films
2000s crime films
2005 films